This article lists diplomatic missions resident in Austria. At present, the capital city of Vienna hosts 125 embassies. Several other countries have ambassadors accredited to Austria, with most being resident in Berlin. 

This listing excludes honorary consulates.

Diplomatic missions in Vienna

Representatives Offices in Vienna

Consulates in Austria

Non-resident embassies 
(In Berlin unless otherwise noted)

 (Geneva)
 (Brussels)
 (Geneva)
 (Geneva)
 (Geneva)

 (Geneva)
 (Brussels)

 (Geneva)
 (Geneva)

 (London)

 (Brussels)
 (Geneva)
 (Reykjavik)
 (Geneva)

 (Geneva)

 (Geneva)
 (Geneva)
 (London)

 
 (Geneva)
 (Singapore)

 (Geneva)

Closed missions

See also 
 Foreign relations of Austria
 Visa policy of Austria
 Visa requirements for Austrian citizens

Notes

References

External links 
 Vienna Diplomatic List
 Vienna Consular List

 
Diplomatic missions
Austria